Topeka is an unincorporated community in Lawrence County, in the U.S. state of Mississippi.

History
The community's name is a transfer from Topeka, Kansas. A post office called Topeka was established in 1903, and remained in operation until 1914.

The Natchez, Columbia and Mobile Railroad operated a rail line through Topeka until 1932.

References

Unincorporated communities in Mississippi
Unincorporated communities in Lawrence County, Mississippi
Mississippi placenames of Native American origin